Ashley Wallace (born 10 September 1987), is a Canadian athlete who competes in compound archery. She has represented the Canadian national team since 2005. She won a silver medal at the World Cup, and became the world number one ranked archer in August 2010.

References

1987 births
Living people
Canadian female archers
Commonwealth Games medallists in archery
Commonwealth Games silver medallists for Canada
Archers at the 2010 Commonwealth Games
Medallists at the 2010 Commonwealth Games